The Ute meridian, also known as the Grand River meridian, was established in 1880 and is a principal meridian of Colorado. The initial point lies inside the boundaries of Grand Junction Regional Airport, Grand Junction, Colorado.

See also
List of principal and guide meridians and base lines of the United States

References

External links

Surveying
Named meridians
Geography of Colorado
Meridians and base lines of the United States